An Almost Merry Widow is a 1950 Argentine film directed by Román Viñoly Barreto.

Cast
  Elina Colomer
  Roberto Escalada
  Carlos Thompson
  Andrés Mejuto
  Judith Sulián
  Adolfo Linvel
  Osvaldo Bruzzi
  Gloria Ferrandiz
  Hilda Rey
  Juan Carrera
  Alberto Berco
  Daniel Tedeschi

References

External links
 

1950 films
1950s Spanish-language films
Argentine black-and-white films
Films directed by Román Viñoly Barreto
Argentine comedy films
1950 comedy films
1950s Argentine films